Sharon Weinberger is an American journalist and writer on defense and security issues. She is a Carnegie/Newhouse School Legal Reporting Fellow where her "project will examine a legally murky intersection between ethics and fraud in military contracting". Starting in Autumn, 2009 she became an International Reporting Project fellow at the Johns Hopkins University School of Advanced International Studies (SAIS).

Education and early career
Weinberger holds a B.A. from Johns Hopkins University, where she was elected to the prestigious honor society Phi Beta Kappa, and M.A.'s from the University of Pittsburgh Graduate School of Public and International Affairs in International Affairs and from Yale University in Russian and East European Studies.

She has also worked as a defense analyst for System Planning Corporation (SPC), a research, electronics and computer software company working for the US DoD, where her work focused on such areas as arms export policy, the Department of Defense laboratory system. Together with Dov S. Zakheim she co-authored a study for the think tank, the Center for Strategic and International Studies entitled Toward a Fortress Europe published in 2000.

Journalist and author
She has written for Wired'''s national security blog, Danger Room. She was editor-in-chief of Defense Technology International, a monthly magazine published by the McGraw Hill Aviation Week Group.  She has written on science and technology policy for periodicals such as Slate, the Financial Times and the Washington Post Magazine. Her first book, Imaginary Weapons, describes a dispute over a weapons concept based on nuclear isomers.

She has written for Foreign Policy and Slate on aspects of life in the Gaza strip.

She is married to fellow national security journalist, Nathan Hodge with whom she co-authored A Nuclear Family Vacation: Travels in the World of Atomic Weaponry in which they describe visits to current and past nuclear weapons sites and meetings with some of the people involved with nuclear weapons programmes.

During the Autumn of 2008 and Spring of 2009 she took a sabbatical to become a Knight Fellow in science journalism at MIT.

Weinberger won an Alicia Patterson Journalism Fellowship in 2011 to research and write about how the science of Facebook is changing modern warfare. In November 2014, Weinberger became national security editor of The Intercept to head its investigative reporting on intelligence, military affairs, government surveillance, and the Edward Snowden archive. She is currently the executive editor for news at Foreign Policy.

See also
 Montgomery McFate
 John B. Alexander
 Essence (Electronic Surveillance System for the Early Notification of Community-based Epidemics)
 Ghost imaging
 Sniffex
 Amir-Abbas Fakhravar
 Nisour Square massacre
 National Ignition Facility
 International Traffic in Arms Regulations
 Imperial Hubris
 Ballotechnics
 2007 Osama bin Laden video

Bibliography
 Imaginary Weapons: A Journey Through the Pentagon's Scientific Underworld (2006) .
 A Nuclear Family Vacation: Travels in the World of Atomic Weaponry (2008) .
 The Imagineers of War:  The Untold Story of DARPA, the Pentagon Agency that Changed the World'', New York, Alfred A. Knopf, 2017, .

References

External links
 Personal website
 Wired's DANGER ROOM blog
 Slate:A Nuclear Family Vacation
 Washington Post Magazine: Xtreme Defense
 Slate: You Can't Handle the Truth

Year of birth missing (living people)
Living people
American women journalists
Johns Hopkins University alumni
University of Pittsburgh alumni
Yale Graduate School of Arts and Sciences alumni
21st-century American women